The Motorola 96XXX (aka 96000, 96K) is a family of digital signal processor (DSP) chips produced by Motorola. They are based on the earlier Motorola 56000 and remain software compatible with them, but have been updated to a full single-precision (32-bit) floating point implementation.

Many of the design features of the 96000 remain similar to the 56000. Where the 56K grouped two 24-bit data and one 8-bit extension register into a single 56-bit accumulator, the 96K groups three 32-bit registers into a 96-bit accumulator. 

Unlike the 56K, the 96000 "family" consisted of a single model, the 96002. It was nowhere near as successful as the 56K, and was only produced for a short period of time. Today its role is filled by products based on the so-called Motorola StarCore.

Digital signal processors
96000
32-bit microprocessors